Ride, Ride, Ride is the debut studio album by American country artist Lynn Anderson. The album was released in March 1967 on Chart Records and was produced by Slim Williamson. The album spawned Anderson's four debut singles for the Chart label, as well as her first Top 10 hit on the Billboard Hot Country Singles chart "If I Kiss You (Will You Go Away)".

Background and content 
Ride, Ride, Ride was prepared in three separate sessions between 1966 and 1967 at the RCA Victor Studio in Nashville, Tennessee, United States. The first session took place in April 1966, which produced the album's fourth and twelfth tracks. The second session took place in August 1966 and produced tracks one, two, seven, and eleven. The final session took place in January 1967 and produced tracks three, five, six, eight, nine, and ten. The album consisted of twelve tracks. Eight of the twelve tracks were co-written by Anderson's mother, songwriter Liz Anderson, who would contribute to writing tracks on many of her other albums for the Chart label following the release of Ride, Ride, Ride. The album's fifth track, "It's Only Lonely Me", was co-written with Lynn Anderson's father Casey Anderson, who was also a songwriter at the time. Three of the four singles released from the album were written entirely by Liz Anderson except the final single "Too Much of You", which was written by Gene Woods.

Ride, Ride, Ride was originally released as an LP record, with six songs on the first side of the record and six songs on the opposite end of the record.

Release 
The lead single for the album entitled "In Person" was released in June 1966 but failed to chart. The title track was released as the album's second single in October 1966, peaking in the Top 40 on the Billboard Magazine Hot Country Singles chart at #36. The third single released was the track "If I Kiss You (Will You Go Away)" in February 1967, which became Anderson's first major hit on the Billboard Magazine country chart, reaching #5. The fourth and final single was the track "Too Much of You" in July 1967, which peaked at #28 on the Billboard country chart later in the year. The album was officially released in March 1967 on Chart Records and peaked at #25 on the Billboard Magazine Top Country Albums chart the year. Ride, Ride, Ride received three out of five stars by Allmusic.

Track listing
All songs were written by Liz Anderson, except where noted.

Sales chart positions 
Album

References 

1967 albums
Albums produced by Slim Williamson
Lynn Anderson albums
Chart Records albums